Jochen Schmid (born 16 August 1963) is a German former Grand Prix motorcycle road racer. He finished the 1992 season seventh overall in the 250cc class, and eighth one year earlier. Schmid competed in the World Superbike Championship from 1994 to 1997 and in 1999, taking two podiums at Hockenheim in 1995.

Motorcycle Grand Prix Results
Points system from 1969 to 1987:

Points system from 1988 to 1992:

Points system from 1993 onwards:

(key) (Races in bold indicate pole position; races in italics indicate fastest lap)

References 

1963 births
Living people
German motorcycle racers
250cc World Championship riders
Superbike World Championship riders